BBC Monthey-Chablais is a Swiss professional basketball team based in Monthey. The team currently plays in the Swiss Ligue Nationale de Basketball. The team has won the Swiss championships three times, in 1996, 2005 and 2017.

In July 2018, the club changed its name from BBC Monthey to BBC Monthey-Chablais.

Trophies
Swiss Basketball League
Winners (3): 1995–96, 2004–05, 2016–17

Swiss Cup 
Winners (2): 2003, 2006

Swiss Basketball League Cup
Winners (2): 2016, 2017

Players

Current roster

Notable players
- Set a club record or won an individual award as a professional player.
- Played at least one official international match for his senior national team at any time.

References

External links
Official Website
Team Profile at Eurobasket.com
Facebook presentation

Basketball teams established in 1966
Basketball teams in Switzerland
Monthey